Victor of Turin succeeded Maximus as bishop of Turin in 465 AD.  He is venerated as a saint.

References 

5th-century Christian saints
Italian saints
Bishops of Turin